Tudor Stefan Rațiu (born March 18, 1950 in Timișoara) is a Romanian-American mathematician who has made contributions to geometric mechanics and dynamical systems theory.

Education
His father, Mircea Ratiu, an engineer, was the younger brother of Ion Rațiu, a well-known Romanian politician, while his mother, Rodica Bucur, was a piano professor at the Conservatory of Music in Timișoara.  Ratiu did his undergraduate studies at the University of Timișoara, completing his B.Sc. in 1973 and his M.S. in 1974.

After moving to the United States, he completed his Ph.D. degree at the University of California, Berkeley in 1980; his dissertation, written under the supervision of Jerrold E. Marsden, was titled Euler-Poisson Equations on Lie Algebras.

Career

From 1980 to 1983 he was a T. H. Hildebrandt Research Assistant Professor at the University of Michigan, after which he became an Associate Professor of Mathematics at the University of Arizona. In 1987 he moved to the University of California, Santa Cruz, where he became a Professor of Mathematics in 1988.

In 1998 Ratiu moved to the École Polytechnique Fédérale de Lausanne, where he was a professor until 2015.  In 2014–15, he was a Professor of Mathematics at the Skolkovo Institute of Science and Technology in Russia. Since 2016 he is a professor at Shanghai Jiao Tong University in China.

Ratiu received a Sloan Research Fellowship in 1980, and he became a fellow of the American Mathematical Society in 2012.

Publications

References

External links

1950 births
Living people
Scientists from Timișoara
20th-century Romanian mathematicians
21st-century Romanian mathematicians
Politehnica University of Timișoara alumni
University of California, Berkeley alumni
University of Michigan faculty
University of Arizona faculty
University of California, Santa Cruz faculty
Academic staff of the École Polytechnique Fédérale de Lausanne
Academic staff of Shanghai Jiao Tong University
Dynamical systems theorists
Fellows of the American Mathematical Society
Sloan Research Fellows